Tiana Ringer (born September 3, 1985) is an American professional wrestler who has competed in North American promotions in Ontario and the North Central United States and has appeared in BSE Pro and Shimmer Women Athletes during the early 2000s.

She has also appeared in All Pro Wrestling, Ring of Honor and toured Mexico with Total Nonstop Action Wrestling participating in an interpromotional event between TNA and Lucha Libre AAA World Wide in September 2006.

Career

Early life and career
Growing up in South Palm Beach, Florida, Ringer began watching World Championship Wrestling professional wrestling with her older brothers during the early 1990s and later became a fan of Chris Jericho. While in high school, Ringer became involved in girl's varsity rugby as well as amateur wrestling winning four gold medals and qualifying for Provincials during her two-year career. Although leaving the wrestling team prior to graduation choosing to focus on her dancing career, she studied Muay Thai after leaving high school.

During this time, she became associated with several independent wrestlers while working as a hostess for a local restaurant and was eventually introduced to one of these wrestlers, Rob "El Fuego" Etcheverria by his fiancé, who was a client of her mother, a professional trainer. Moving to Toronto, Ontario in early 2003, she began training under Etcheverria at Squared Circle and later continued to train occasionally with Scott D'Amore and Tyson Dux in Windsor before making her professional debut in June 2004.

That same year she was featured in the two-part wrestling documentary Slam Bam which aired on the Discovery Channel.

Shimmer Women Athletes and Blood Sweat and Ears
After a year in Etcheverria's Squared Circle promotion, Ringer also competed in several Ontario-based independent promotions including New Vision Pro Wrestling defeating Rossana, 21st Century Fox and fellow Squared Circle Training graduate Shantelle Taylor in a 4-way elimination match to win the NVPW Women's Championship in late-2004 before losing the title to Taylor in mid-2005.

Ringer joined SHIMMER Women Athletes later that year where she quickly became involved in a feud with Shantelle Taylor losing to her on the company's debut event Volume 1 on November 6, 2005 although she would defeat Taylor & Ariel in a tag team match with Cheerleader Melissa on Volume 2 which was taped later that same night.

Their feud would continue during the next year as Ringer faced Taylor in several single matches all over the North American independent circuit including in the Ontario-based BSE Pro. On February 12, 2006, Ringer took part in the tapings of SHIMMER's Volumes 3 and 4 where she was defeated by Cindy Rogers, in a three-way match with Amber O'Neal, and Allison Danger, in a singles match, respectively.

Appearing on several events for Blood Sweat and Ears during the next two months, Ringer would lose to Shantelle Taylor in a 3-way match with Danyah Rays on February 26 and on March 19 she teamed with Rays losing to Shantelle Taylor & Traci Brooks. On March 30, 2006, she made her Ring of Honor debut in a "SHIMMER Showcase" dark match at Dragon Gate Challenge where she and Lacey defeated Taylor and Allison Danger in a tag team match.

On May 7. 2006, Ringer returned to Blood Sweat and Ears defeating Taylor and Traci Brooks in a tag team match with Gail Kim as her partner, and Taylor and Ariel with Cheerleader Melissa as her partner later that same night. She spent the rest of the summer competing in various independent promotions in Ontario including Great Canadian Wrestling, Motor City Wrestling and the Pure Wrestling Association.

From San Francisco to Ontario
In September 2006 Ringer participated in All Pro Wrestling's ChickFight tournament and lost to KAORU via rear naked choke knockout in the opening rounds in San Francisco, California on September 2. The following night, she lost to Hailey Hatred in a four-way match with Allison Danger and MsChif.

After defeating Tracy Brooks at a Blood Sweat and Ears event on September 10, Ringer made her wrestling debut in Mexico on September 17, when she wrestled at an interpromotional event held by Total Nonstop Action Wrestling and Lucha Libre AAA World Wide at the Arena Cuatro Caminos de Nuevo Laredo where she teamed up with Traci Brooks to defeat Estrellita and Tiffany.

On October 22, 2006, Ringer picked up her first one-on-one SHIMMER victory when she defeated "Country Girl" Lorelei Lee on Volume 7. On Volume 8, taped later that same night, she was defeated by Daizee Haze, before losing to Kelly Couture on October 29 at a Blood Sweat and Ears event.

Recent years
After being named 2006 Female Wrestler of the Year by Ontario Independent Wrestling, Ringer would, on January 20, 2007, participate in a Siren Battle Royal at a Sin City Wrestling event in Tecumseh, Ontario. She eliminated Hailey Rogers to win the match, which also involved Jamie D, Amy Victory and Deanna Conda.

After losing to April Hunter at a Pro Wrestling Xtreme event in St. Thomas, Ontario on January 27, she would also face Deanna Conda and Jaime D on February 18 in a 3-way match which ended in a no contest after Sinn and Hellvis interfered and attacked all three competitors. During the next several weeks she would face Cherry Bomb and Hailey Rogers in singles matches before teaming with Danyah Rays and Traci Brooks in a losing effort against Kelly Couture, Gail Kim and Bang Bang Pete in Timmins, Ontario on March 17.

On April 7, 2007, Ringer traveled back to Berwyn, Illinois to take part in SHIMMER's tapings of Volumes 9 and 10. On Volume 9 she was defeated by Nikki Roxx before defeating "The Jezebel" Eden Black on Volume 10. Later that month, she would also team with Danyah Rays losing to Cherry Bomb and Krystal Banks when she was pinned by Banks at a Canadian Wrestling Revolution show in Vaughan, Ontario on April 29.

After missing several shows due to the death of her grandfather in early 2007, she announced on her website that she would be taking an indefinite leave of absence from professional wrestling on June 25 in order to attend York University to complete her final year and receive her Bachelor of Science degree in Kinesiology. Tiana has plans to continue studying physiotherapy and complete a two-year Masters program commencing September 2008.

After over a four-year hiatus from professional wrestling, Ringer made her return on October 8, 2011, facing Mercedes Martinez in a losing effort at an NCW Femmes Fatales event in Montreal, Quebec.

Championships and accomplishments
New Vision Pro Wrestling
NVPW Women's Championship (1 time)

References

External links
2006 Top 50 Independent Women Wrestlers: #32. Tiana Ringer
Profile at Online World of Wrestling
G.L.O.R.Y. Biography
CageMatch.de - Tiana Ringer 

1985 births
American female professional wrestlers
People from Palm Beach County, Florida
Living people
People from Vaughan
21st-century American women
21st-century professional wrestlers